Sunil Ibrahim is an Indian  screenwriter, film producer and film director. His first film was Chapters in 2012, where Nivin Pauly and Sreenivasan played the lead roles. His second movie was Arikil Oraal released in 2013.

Film career

Sunil Ibrahim started his film career with the movie  Chapters.  His second movie was Arikil Oraal where Indrajith Sukumaran, Nivin Pauly and Remya Nambeesan played the leads. It was a psychological thriller movie. Y movie Released in 17 November 2017 with 40 new faces and Alencier Ley Lopez received good reviews and ran successfully in theaters. His fourth movie is "Roy" where Suraj Venjaramood, Sija Rose, Shine Tom Chacko and Jins Baskar are playing the lead roles.

Filmography

 As Director

 As Producer

References

  Yakshi Faithfully Yours director Abhiram Suresh will be debuting as an actor through Sunil Ibrahim’s Y. Deccan Chronicle
 Jins Baskar will be next featured in director Sunil Ibrahim’s upcoming flick Y in a substantial role. Deccan Chronicle
 Times Of India Y movie Review
 Deccan Chronicle said "A freshly brewed formula with new Faces"
 On Location: Arikil Oraal - True colours
 No hero, heroine in Sunil Ibrahim's 'Chapters

External links

 

Indian filmmakers
Indian male screenwriters
Living people
Screenwriters from Kerala
1978 births